Khazana Building Museum is a Museum located in Hyderabad, Telangana, India. It has a collection of relics from Qutb Shahi, Bahmani and Kakatiya dynasties. The museum is, as of 2018, sealed and not open to the public.

History
The building was built in 1580 AD by the Qutb Shahi kings for housing kingdoms khazana or treasury. It was known as Khazana Khana. The building was renovated and converted into a museum in 2013. It is located in the vicinity of Golconda Fort.

The Collection
The museum has a collection of rare coins to centuries-old relics unearthed during various excavations, 3,500 arms and weapons of Qutb Shahi, stone sculptures from neighbouring regions of Chalukya and Kakatiya, artefacts from the Bahmani kingdom.

See also
 Nizam's Museum

References

Museums in Hyderabad, India
Art museums and galleries in India
Heritage structures in Hyderabad, India
2013 establishments in Andhra Pradesh
Museums established in 2013